Bernardo Matić (born 27 July 1994) is a Croatian professional footballer who plays for Ordabasy.

Club career
Having passed through the ranks of hometown club Junak Sinj and Hajduk Split youth academy, Matić made his professional debut for Junak during the 2011–12 1. HNL season. In the summer of 2013, he joined Zagreb. On 17 February 2017, he signed a -year deal with Rijeka, which tied him with the club until June 2018.

In July 2017, Matić was loaned to Bosnian Premier League club Široki Brijeg. In June 2018, he signed a two-year contract with Široki Brijeg.

On 11 October 2020, Matić left Široki Brijeg and signed a contract with Spanish Segunda División B club Racing de Santander.

International career
Matić was capped for both the Croatia U19 and U21 national teams.

Career statistics

Honours
Zagreb
2. HNL: 2013–14

Rijeka
1. HNL: 2016–17
Croatian Cup: 2016–17

References

External links
 

1994 births
Living people
People from Sinj
Association football central defenders
Croatian footballers
Croatia youth international footballers
Croatia under-21 international footballers
NK Junak Sinj players
NK Zagreb players
HNK Rijeka players
NK Široki Brijeg players
Racing de Santander players
NK Istra 1961 players
HNK Šibenik players
Croatian Football League players
First Football League (Croatia) players
Premier League of Bosnia and Herzegovina players
Segunda División B players
Croatian expatriate footballers
Expatriate footballers in Bosnia and Herzegovina
Croatian expatriate sportspeople in Bosnia and Herzegovina
Expatriate footballers in Spain
Croatian expatriate sportspeople in Spain